The Oil City Pennsylvania Railroad Bridge is a truss bridge that carries the Western New York and Pennsylvania Railroad (WNY&P) across the Allegheny River between Cranberry Township and Oil City, Pennsylvania. The bridge was originally built to serve the Pennsylvania Railroad as part of its Buffalo Line. WNY&P is the fourth owner of the structure. After the breakup of the Pennsy, Conrail took ownership of the line. The breakup of these company saw Norfolk Southern assigned the rights; the WNY&P took ownership in 2006 as they extended their trackage from Meadville, Pennsylvania to Oil City. Because the bridge once served as a major junction point for several Pennsylvania Railroad lines, it features a unique approach structure. One section went from Oil City through Tidioute, Pennsylvania and then on to Warren, Pennsylvania. This line was operated until 1976. It was removed in the early 1980s.

See also
List of bridges documented by the Historic American Engineering Record in Pennsylvania
List of crossings of the Allegheny River

References

External links

Bridges completed in 1902
Bridges over the Allegheny River
Historic American Engineering Record in Pennsylvania
Railroad bridges in Pennsylvania
Truss bridges in the United States
Metal bridges in the United States